Gregory Lamont Vaughn (born July 3, 1965) is an American former baseball left fielder who played for the Milwaukee Brewers (1989–1996), San Diego Padres (1996–1998), Cincinnati Reds (1999), Tampa Bay Devil Rays (2000–2002) and Colorado Rockies (2003) of Major League Baseball (MLB). He was born in Sacramento, California, where he attended Kennedy High School.  He then played baseball at the University of Miami. He is the cousin of fellow former major leaguers Mo Vaughn and Jerry Royster.

Career

Amateur

In 1984 and 1985, Vaughn played collegiate summer baseball for the Cotuit Kettleers of the Cape Cod Baseball League (CCBL). He led the Kettleers to league titles in both seasons, and was league MVP in 1985. Vaughn was inducted into the CCBL Hall of Fame in 2009.

Professional

Vaughn was selected by the Brewers in the fourth round (75th pick) of the 1984 amateur draft. A slugger whose batting average dropped below .250 as often as rising above it, he compensated with excellent power. He had three seasons with at least 100 runs batted in, and four with 30 or more home runs – including the  season, when he hit 50 to finish 4th in the major leagues behind Ken Griffey Jr., Sammy Sosa, and Mark McGwire, who set the home run record that season.  In 1999, he became the first player in major league history to be traded after a 50-homer season when the Padres traded him to the Cincinnati Reds. Vaughn's arrival in Cincinnati caused a bit of a controversy with club ownership, as he refused to shave his goatee to comply with the Reds' policy of no facial hair. Fans urged owner Marge Schott to lift the long-standing policy that had been in place since 1967, which she eventually did.  On the field, Vaughn hit 45 homers and became the second player in major league history to hit 40 or more homers in consecutive seasons with two different teams (one year after Andrés Galarraga became the first).

Throughout his career, Vaughn batted .242 with 355 home runs, 1072 RBI, 1017 runs, 1475 hits, 284 doubles, 23 triples and 121 stolen bases in 1731 games.

Vaughn became eligible for the National Baseball Hall of Fame in 2009. 75% of the vote was necessary for induction, and 5% was necessary to stay on the ballot. He received no votes and dropped off the ballot.

Personal life
His son, Cory Vaughn, played minor league baseball in the New York Mets organization.

See also

 50 home run club
 List of Major League Baseball career home run leaders
 List of Major League Baseball career runs scored leaders
 List of Major League Baseball career runs batted in leaders

References
Notes

External links
, or Retrosheet, or Pelota Binaria (Venezuelan Winter League)

1965 births
Living people
African-American baseball players
American Association (1902–1997) MVP Award winners
American League All-Stars
Baseball players from Sacramento, California
Beloit Brewers players
Cardenales de Lara players
American expatriate baseball players in Venezuela
Cincinnati Reds players
Colorado Rockies players
Colorado Springs Sky Sox players
Cotuit Kettleers players
Denver Zephyrs players
El Paso Diablos players
Helena Gold Sox players
Major League Baseball designated hitters
Major League Baseball left fielders
Miami Hurricanes baseball players
Milwaukee Brewers players
National League All-Stars
Sacramento City Panthers baseball players
San Diego Padres players
Silver Slugger Award winners
Tampa Bay Devil Rays players
21st-century African-American people
20th-century African-American sportspeople